Weerasekara may refer to:

Ananda Weerasekara, Sri Lankan navy admiral 
Sarath Weerasekara, Sri Lankan army officer
Susith Weerasekara, Sri Lankan navy officer

Sinhalese surnames